Pudasjärvi Airfield  ( or ) is an airfield in Pudasjärvi, Finland, about  north-northwest from Kurenalus, the Pudasjärvi town centre.

See also
List of airports in Finland

References

External links
 VFR Suomi/Finland – Pudasjärvi Airfield
 Lentopaikat.net – Pudasjärvi Airfield 
 Sunny Nights Fly-in

Airports in Finland
Airfield
Buildings and structures in North Ostrobothnia